The USO 50th Anniversary silver dollar is a commemorative silver dollar issued by the United States Mint in 1991.

See also

 List of United States commemorative coins and medals (1990s)
 United States commemorative coins

References

1991 establishments in the United States
Eagles on coins
Maps on coins
Modern United States commemorative coins
United Service Organizations